The R814 road, or Lombard Street East, is a regional road in Dublin, Ireland.

The official definition of the R814 from the Roads Act 1993 (Classification of Regional Roads) Order 2006 states:

R814: Lombard Street East, Dublin

Between its junction with R813 at City Quay and its junction with R118 at Pearse Street via Lombard Street East all in the city of Dublin.

The street is 300 metres long.

See also
Roads in Ireland
National primary road
National secondary road
Regional road

References

Regional roads in the Republic of Ireland
Roads in County Dublin